The 2009–10 Marquette Golden Eagles men's basketball team represented Marquette University in the 2009–2010 NCAA Division I basketball season. Marquette was coached by Buzz Williams and played their home games at the Bradley Center in Milwaukee, WI. The Golden Eagles are members of the Big East Conference. They finished the season 22–12, 11–7 in Big East play. They advanced to the semifinals of the 2010 Big East men's basketball tournament before losing to Georgetown. They received an at–large bid to the 2010 NCAA Division I men's basketball tournament, earning a 6 seed in the East Region, where they were upset by 11 seed Washington in the first round.

Roster
Source

2009-10 Schedule and results
Source
All times are Central

|-
!colspan=9| Exhibition

|-
!colspan=9| Regular Season

|-
!colspan=9| Big East tournament

|-
!colspan=10| 2010 NCAA Division I men's basketball tournament

See also
2009-10 Big East Conference men's basketball season
2010 NCAA Division I men's basketball tournament
Marquette Golden Eagles men's basketball

Notes

Marquette Golden Eagles
Marquette
Marquette Golden Eagles men's basketball seasons
Marquette
Marquette